Deleau is a locality within the Rural Municipality of Sifton in southwestern Manitoba, Canada. It is located along Manitoba Highway 2 approximately 21 kilometres (13 miles) northwest of Hartney.

References 

Localities in Manitoba